Kotlari is a village in Krumovgrad Municipality, Kardzhali Province, southern Bulgaria.

Honours
Kotlari Peak on Brabant Island, Antarctica is named after the village.

References

Villages in Kardzhali Province